Mark Cohen (born August 24, 1943) is an American photographer best known for his innovative close-up street photography.

Cohen's major books of photography are Grim Street (2005), True Color (2007), and Mexico (2016). His work was first exhibited in a group exhibition at George Eastman House in 1969 and he had his first solo exhibition at the Museum of Modern Art in New York City in 1973. He was awarded Guggenheim Fellowships in 1971 and 1976. and received a National Endowment for the Arts grant in 1975.

Life and work
Cohen was born and lived in Wilkes-Barre, Pennsylvania until 2013. He attended Penn State University and Wilkes College between 1961 and 1965, and opened a commercial photo studio in 1966.

The majority of the photography for which Cohen is known is shot in the Scranton/Wilkes-Barre metropolitan area (also known as the Wyoming Valley), a historic industrialized region of northeastern Pennsylvania. Characteristically Cohen photographs people close-up, using a wide-angle lens and a flash, mostly in black and white, frequently cropping their heads from the frame, concentrating on small details. He has used 21 mm, 28 mm and 35 mm focal length, wide-angle, lenses and later on 50 mm. Cohen has described his method as 'intrusive'; "They're not easy pictures. But I guess that's why they're mine."

Discussing his influences with Thomas Southall in 2004 he cites ". . . so many photographers who followed Cartier-Bresson, like Frank, Koudelka, Winogrand, Friedlander." He also recognizes the influence of Diane Arbus. Whilst acknowledging these influences he says: "I knew about art photography...Then I did these outside the context of any other photographer."

In 2013 Cohen moved to Philadelphia, Pennsylvania.

Publications

Books by Cohen
Mark Cohen, Photographer: A Monograph. 1980. 38 pp. .
Mark Cohen: October 10 – December 13, 1981. Washington, DC: Corcoran Gallery of Art, 1981. 24 pp. .
Images: A Photographic Essay of Northeastern Pennsylvania. Avoca, PA: Economic Development Council of Northeastern Pennsylvania, 1982. 58 pp. .
Five Minutes in Mexico: Photographs. Wilkes-Barre, PA: Sordoni Art Gallery, 1989. 71 pp. .
Grim Street. New York: powerHouse, 2005. .
True Color. New York: powerHouse, 2007. . Text by Vince Aletti. Work in colour originating as a commission from George Eastman House.
 Italian Riviera. Rome: Punctum, 2008. . Edition of 40 copies. Made along the Levante Riviera, during his stay in Rapallo, Liguria.
Mark Cohen: Strange Evidence. Self-published / CreateSpace, 2012. . Catalogue of the exhibition Mark Cohen: Strange Evidence at the Philadelphia Museum of Art, January 2010 to March 2011, curated by Peter Barbiere.
Dark Knees. Paris: Xavier Barral, 2013. . "Wilkes-Barre and around Pennsylvania 1969–2012". "Published on the occasion  of the exhibition Mark Cohen Dark Knees at [Le Bal] in Paris between September 27 and December 8, 2013 and at the Nederlands Fotomuseum in Rotterdam between November 8, 2014 and January 11, 2015."
Frame: a Retrospective. Austin: University of Texas, 2015. . With an introduction by Jane Livingston.
Mexico. Austin: University of Texas, 2016. .
Bread in Snow. Tokyo: Super Labo, 2019. .
Cotton. Tokyo: Super Labo, 2021. .

Contributions to publications
Contatti. Provini d'Autore = Choosing the best photo by using the contact sheet. Vol. I. Edited by Giammaria De Gasperis. Rome: Postcart, 2012. .

Books about Cohen
Wonders Seen in Forsaken Places: An essay on the photographs and the process of photography of Mark Cohen by Alphonso Lingis. Self-published / CreateSpace, 2010. .

Awards
1971: Guggenheim Fellowship, John Simon Guggenheim Memorial Foundation
1975: National Endowment for the Arts grant
1976: Guggenheim Fellowship, John Simon Guggenheim Memorial Foundation

Exhibitions

Solo exhibitions
1962: Pennsylvania State University, University Park
1965: Wilkes College, Wilkes-Barre, Pennsylvania
1967: Spanish National Tourist Office, New York City
1973: Photographs by Mark Cohen, Museum of Modern Art, New York City
1975: Art Institute of Chicago
2010/2011: Mark Cohen: Strange Evidence, Philadelphia Museum of Art
2013: Mark Cohen: Italian Riviera, 2008, Maslow Collection at Marywood University, Scranton, PA
2013: Dark Knees (1969–2012), Le Bal, Paris
2014: Mark Cohen, Danziger Gallery, New York
2014/2015: Dark Knees, Netherlands Photo Museum, Rotterdam

Group exhibitions
1969: Vision and Expression, George Eastman House, Rochester, New York. Organised by Nathan Lyons.
1978: Mirrors and Windows: American Photography Since 1960, Museum of Modern Art, New York City

Collections
Cohen's work is held in the following permanent collections:
Art Institute of Chicago, Chicago
Corcoran Gallery of Art, Washington, D.C.
Fogg Art Museum, Cambridge, MA
George Eastman House, Rochester, New York
Metropolitan Museum of Art, New York City
Musee de la Photographie, Belgium
Museum of Fine Arts, Houston
Museum of Modern Art, New York City
National Gallery of Victoria, Melbourne, Australia
The Polaroid Collection, Massachusetts Institute of Technology, Cambridge, MA
Victoria and Albert Museum, London
Whitney Museum of American Art, New York City: 4 prints

References

External links
 Cohen biography at Danziger Gallery
 Cohen explains and demonstrates how he works, Contemporary Photographie in the USA (Spring 1982), Michael Engler Filmproduktion (6 m video)

People from Wilkes-Barre, Pennsylvania
American photographers
Street photographers
Pennsylvania State University alumni
1943 births
Living people
20th-century American Jews
21st-century American Jews